The Rio Guaporé mouse or Guaporé akodont (Juscelinomys guaporensis) was formerly considered a rodent species in the family Cricetidae. It is known only from a small savanna in eastern Bolivia near the Rio Guaporé. However, in 2012 it was described as being conspecific with J. huanchacae.

References

Animal Diversity Web

Mammals of Bolivia
Juscelinomys
Mammals described in 1999
Taxobox binomials not recognized by IUCN